The 1978–79 Detroit Titans men's basketball team represented the University of Detroit in the 1978–79 NCAA Division I men's basketball season.  The team played at Calihan Hall in Detroit.

The Titans were led by second-year head coach Smokey Gaines, a former assistant coach serving under Dick Vitale. After missing out on a bid the previous season, the Titans received an at-large bid to the NCAA tournament. Playing as the No. 7 seed in the Mideast region, Detroit fell to No. 10 seed Lamar in the opening round to finish the season with a 22–6 record.

Roster

Schedule and results

|-
!colspan=9 style=| Regular Season

|-
!colspan=9 style=| NCAA Tournament

Rankings

References

Detroit Mercy Titans men's basketball seasons
Detroit
Detroit
Detroit Titans men's b
Detroit Titans men's b